Like a Dragon, formerly titled Yakuza outside Japan, is a role playing video game series developed by Ryu Ga Gotoku and published by Sega. The series debuted in 2005 with the release of Yakuza on PlayStation 2. By 2022, the series sold over 19 million copies.

The majority games take place in the fictional red light district of Kamurocho, based on Kabukichō, Tokyo. Like a Dragon titles are usually released originally in Japan, before being released in the west a year later; the series is largely exclusive to the PlayStation series of consoles, and have made the transition to multiplatform releases in the eighth generation of video game consoles.

Related books, dramatizations and music albums have also been released.

Video games

Main series

Spin-offs

Remasters

Other media

Books

Dramatizations

Music albums

Notes

References

Yakuza
Yakuza